The People's Republic of China competed at the 1992 Summer Olympics in Barcelona, Spain. 244 competitors, 117 men and 127 women, took part in 144 events in 23 sports.

Medalists

After the olympics, the name "Five Golden Flowers" was given to the five medalist swimmers Yang Wenyi (50 meter Freestyle champion), Zhuang Yong (100 meter Freestyle champion), Lin Li (200 meter Individual Medley champion), Qian Hong (100 meter Butterfly champion) and Wang Xiaohong (200 meter Butterfly silver medalist).

Competitors
The following is the list of number of competitors in the Games.

Archery

The People's Republic of China sent three men and three women to Barcelona for archery.  Just as in 1984, the women were the more successful squad, winning the team silver.  All three qualified for the elimination rounds, with one falling in the first round, another dropping in the second, and Wang Xiaozhu making it all the way to the semifinals before being defeated.  In contrast, the men lost their first team match and only one qualified for individual eliminations.

Women's Individual Competition:
 Wang Xiaozhu - bronze medal match, 4th place (3-2)
 Ma Xiangjun - round of 16, 12th place (1-1)
 Wang Hong - round of 32, 31st place (0-1)

Men's Individual Competition:
 Fu Shengjun - round of 32, 29th place (0-1)
 Hao Wei - ranking round, 51st place (0-0)
 Liang Qiang - ranking round, 58th place (0-0)

Women's Team Competition
 Wang, Ma, and Wang - final, silver medal (3-1)

Men's Team Competition
 Fu, Hao, and Liang - round of 16, 12th place (0-1)

Athletics

Men's 110 metres Hurdles
Li Tong

Men's 20 km Walk
Chen Shaoguo — 1:24:06 (→ 5th place)
Li Mingcai — DNF (→ no ranking)

Men's 50 km Walk
Li Mingcai — did not start (→ no ranking)

Men's Long Jump
Huang Geng
 Qualification — 8.22 m
 Final — 7.87 m (→ 8th place)
Chen Zunrong
 Qualification — 7.93 m
 Final — 7.75 m (→ 10th place)

Men's Triple Jump
Zou Sixin
 Qualification — 17.07 m
 Final — 17.00 m (→ 8th place)
Chen Yanping
 Qualification — 15.66 m (→ did not advance)

Men's Javelin Throw
Zhang Lianbiao 
 Qualification — 73.86 m (→ did not advance)

Men's Hammer Throw
Bi Zhong 
 Qualification — 74.30 m (→ did not advance)

Men's Discus Throw
Yu Wenge 
 Qualification — 59.42 m (→ did not advance)

Women's 100 metres
Xiao Yehua
Gao Han
Tian Yumei

Women's 200 metres
Chen Zhaojing

Women's 1,500 metres
Qu Yunxia
Liu Li

Women's 10,000 metres
Zhong Huandi
 Heat — 32:04.46
 Final — 31:21.08 (→ 4th place)
Wang Xiuting
 Heat — 32:31.91
 Final — 31:28.06 (→ 6th place)

Women's 100 metres Hurdles
Zhang Yu
Zhu Yuqing

Women's 10 km Walk
Chen Yueling
 Final — 44:32 (→  Gold Medal)
Li Chunxiu
 Final — 44:41 (→  Bronze Medal)
Cui Yingzi
 Final — 45:15 (→ 5th place)

Women's Long Jump
 Yang Juan 
 Heat — 6.49 m (→ did not advance)
 Liu Shuzhen 
 Heat — 6.44 m (→ did not advance)

Women's Discus Throw
 Min Chunfeng 
 Heat — 62.48m
 Final — 60.82m (→ 11th place)
 Qiu Qiaoping 
 Heat — 59.32m (→ did not advance)

Women's Shot Put
 Huang Zhihong 
 Zhou Tianhua
 Zhen Wenhua

Women's Javelin Throw
 Xu Demei
 Ha Xiaoyan

Women's Heptathlon
 Zhu Yuqing

Badminton

Basketball

Men's competition
Preliminary Round (Group B)
Lost to Lithuania (75-112)
Lost to Puerto Rico (68-100)
Lost to Unified Team (84-100)
Lost to Australia (66-88)
Lost to Venezuela (88-96)
Classification Matches
9th/12th place: Lost to Angola (69-79)
11th/12th place: Lost to Venezuela (97-100) → 12th place
 Team Roster
Adiljan Jun
Gong Xiaobin
Hu Weidong
Li Chunjiang
Ma Jian
Shan Tao
Song Ligang
Sun Fengwu
Sun Jun
Wang Zhidan
Wu Qinglong
Zhang Yongjun

Women's competition
Preliminary Round (Group B)
Defeated Spain (66-63)
Lost to United States (67-93)
Defeated Czechoslovakia (72-70)
Semifinals
Defeated Cuba (109-70)
Final
Lost to Unified Team (66-76) →  Silver Medal
Team Roster
Cong Xuedi 
He Jun
Li Dongmei 
Li Xin 
Liu Jun
Liu Qing 
Peng Ping 
Wang Fang 
Zhan Shuping 
Zheng Dongmei 
Zheng Haixia

Boxing

Men's Flyweight (– 51 kg)
Liu Gang
 First Round — Lost to Héctor Avila (DOM), RSC-2 (02:38)

Men's Bantamweight (– 54 kg)
Zhang Guangping
 First Round — Lost to Slimane Zengli (ALG), 0:4

Men's Middleweight (– 71 kg)
Lu Chao
 First Round — Bye
 Second Round — Lost to Stefan Trendafilov (BUL), RSC-1 (01:45)

Men's Light-Heavyweight (– 81 kg)
Bai Chongguang
 First Round — Lost to Ko Yo-Da (KOR), 4:18

Canoeing

Cycling

Six cyclists, four men and two women, represented China in 1992.

Men's road race
 Tang Xuezhong
 Zhu Zhengjun
 Wang Shusen

Men's team time trial
 Li Wenkai
 Wang Shusen
 Zhu Zhengjun
 Tang Xuezhong

Men's points race
 Li Wenkai

Women's sprint
 Wang Yan

Women's individual pursuit
 Zhou Lingmei

Diving

Men's 3m Springboard
Tan Liangde
 Preliminary Round — 426.39 points
 Final — 645.57 points (→  Silver Medal)
Wei Lan
 Preliminary Round — 369.09 points (→ did not advance, 14th place)

Men's 10m Platform
Sun Shuwei
 Preliminary Round — 447.96 points
Final — 677.31 points (→  Gold Medal)
Xiong Ni
 Preliminary Round — 453.87 points
Final — 600.15 points (→  Bronze Medal)

Women's 3m Springboard
Gao Min
 Preliminary Round — 309.75 points 
Final — 572.40 points (→  Gold Medal)
 Tan Shuping
 Preliminary Round — 269.10 points (→ did not advance, 17th place)

Women's 10m Platform
Fu Mingxia
Final — 461.43 points (→  Gold Medal)
Zhou Jihong
Final — 400.56 points (→ 4th place)

Fencing

15 fencers, 10 men and 5 women, represented China in 1992.

Men's foil
 Ye Chong
 Wang Haibin
 Wang Lihong

Men's team foil
 Ye Chong, Wang Haibin, Wang Lihong, Chen Biao, Lao Shaopei

Men's sabre
 Zheng Zhaokang
 Yang Zhen
 Jia Guihua

Men's team sabre
 Jia Guihua, Ning Xiankui, Yang Zhen, Jiang Yefei, Zheng Zhaokang

Women's foil
 Wang Huifeng
 Xiao Aihua
 E Jie

Women's team foil
 E Jie, Liang Jun, Wang Huifeng, Xiao Aihua, Ye Lin

Gymnastics

Judo

Modern pentathlon

One male pentathlete represented China in 1992.

Men's Individual Competition
 Zhang Bin → 56th place (4670 points)

Rhythmic gymnastics

Rowing

Sailing

Men's Sailboard (Lechner A-390)
Chen Jiang
 Final Ranking — 158.7 points (→ 14th place)

Women's Sailboard (Lechner A-390)
Zhang Xiaodong
 Final Ranking — 65.8 points (→  Silver Medal)

Shooting

Swimming

Synchronized swimming

Three synchronized swimmers represented China in 1992.

Women's solo
 Tan Min
 Guan Zewen
 Wang Xiaojie

Women's duet
 Guan Zewen
 Wang Xiaojie

Table tennis

Tennis

Women's Singles Competition
Li Fang
 First Round — Lost to Brenda Schultz-McCarthy (Netherland) 5-7, 7-6, 4-6
 Chen Li-Ling
 First Round — Lost to Mary Joe Fernandez (USA) 2-6, 3-6

Volleyball

Weightlifting

Wrestling

References

Nations at the 1992 Summer Olympics
1992
Summer Olympics